Douglas Stewart may refer to:
Douglas Stewart (poet) (1913–1985), Australian poet
Edward Askew Sothern (1826–1881), English actor who was sometimes known as Douglas Stewart
Douglas Stewart (equestrian) (1913–1991), British Olympic equestrian
Douglas Stewart (film editor) (1919–1995), American film and television editor
Douglas Day Stewart, American screenwriter
Doug Stewart (game designer)
Doug Stewart (radio broadcaster)
Doug (Lawrence Douglas) Stewart, Australian race and rally driver and founder of Ralliart
Douglass Stewart, American playwright

See also
Douglas Stuart (disambiguation)